Chaudhry Faisal Farooq Cheema is a Pakistani politician who was a Member of the Provincial Assembly of Punjab, from 2002 to 2007 and again from May 2013 to May 2018.

Early life and education
He was born on 10 July 1973 in Sargodha.

He has a degree of Master of Arts where he received in 1997 from Government College, Sargodha.

Political career
He was elected to the Provincial Assembly of the Punjab as a candidate of Pakistan Muslim League (Q) (PML-Q) from Constituency PP-35 (Sarghoda-VIII) in 2002 Pakistani general election. He received 35,571 votes and defeated Sardar Kamil Gujjar, a candidate of Pakistan Peoples Party (PPP).

He ran for the seat of the Provincial Assembly of the Punjab as a candidate of Pakistan Muslim League (N) (PML-N) from Constituency PP-35 (Sarghoda-VIII) in 2008 Pakistani general election but was unsuccessful. He secured 32,753 votes and lost the seat to Sardar Kamil Gujjar, a candidate of PPP.

He was re-elected to the Provincial Assembly of the Punjab as an independent candidate from Constituency PP-35 (Sarghoda-VIII) in 2013 Pakistani general election. He received 41,853 votes and defeated Sardar Kamil Gujjar, a candidate of PML-N. He joined PML-N in May 2013. In April 2018, he quit PML-N and joined Pakistan Tehreek-e-Insaf (PTI).

He was re-elected to Provincial Assembly of the Punjab as a candidate of PTI from Constituency PP-76 (Sargodha-V) in 2018 Pakistani general election.

References

Living people
Punjab MPAs 2013–2018
1973 births
Punjab MPAs 2002–2007
Punjab MPAs 2018–2023
Pakistan Tehreek-e-Insaf MPAs (Punjab)